Hercules was launched at Bristol in 1796 as a West Indiaman. In 1815 A United States privateer captured her but the Royal Navy recaptured her. Because the recapture occurred after 1 March 1815, she was returned to the United States.

Career
Hercules first appeared in Lloyd's Register (LR) in 1796.

Fate
On 9 February 1815 Hercules, Rae, master, passed Tenerife in company with Josephine, Gillies, master. Hercules was on her way from Bristol to Jamaica, and Josephine was on her way from Liverpool to St Lucia. 
They had parted from the West Indies convoy on 29 January in a gale.

Hollins took out part of Herculess cargo and stores and sent her to America. Rae and his crew arrived at Grenada on 5 March.

The schooner  recaptured Hercules off Abacco on 9 March, and reportedly sent her to Halifax.

Hercules arrived at Nassau. There she was to be returned to the Americans.

All British vessels American vessels had captured prior to 1 March and still in American possession after that date were returned to them, even if the vessels had been recaptured after 1 March. The reason was that the Treaty of Ghent, which ended the War of 1812 between the United Kingdom and the United States, took effect on 1 March. Therefore, any vessel that the Americans had captured before March 1, i.e., during wartime, such as Hercules, was a valid prize, and a vessel recaptured after 1 March, such as Hercules, was recaptured during peacetime, and so not a valid prize.

Notes, citations, and references
Notes

Citations

References
 
 

1796 ships
Ships built in Bristol
Age of Sail merchant ships of England
Captured ships